Scorched Planet is a 1996 vehicular combat video game developed by Criterion Studios and published by Virgin Interactive for DOS and Windows. The game was later adapted for arcade machines.

Gameplay
Scorched Planet is a vehicular shooter game taking place in the year 2230 on the fictional planet Dator 5. The planet is being attacked by an alien race, called the Voraxians. The player plays as Alex Gibson, an ex-fighter pilot tasked with saving the colonists on Dator 5. The player must fight off waves of Voraxians on 19 different missions in order to save all the colonists. The player has a choice to rush in and attack or lay out defenses before starting the missions. The primary mechanic of the game is that your Type 16 fighter, you can morph between tank and spacecraft form, each having their own perks and downsides. The game takes place over 7 different landscapes, each having unique enemies. After completing all 19 missions, the game is complete and the colonists are saved.

Reception
Next Generation reviewed the arcade version of the game, rating it two stars out of five, and stated that "really, the only unusual aspect of the game is that vehicles can morph between a flying ship and a tank, each with its own capabilities and weapons. But that's hardly enough to maintain attention spans into the wee hours of the morning".

Reviews
Computer Gaming World #153 (Apr 1997)
GameSpot - Jan 16, 1997
Computer Games Magazine - 1997
Game Revolution - Dec, 1996
PC Player (Germany) - Nov, 1996
PC Games - Oct, 1996

References

1996 video games
Arcade video games
Criterion Games games
DOS games
First-person shooters
Vehicle simulation games
Video games developed in the United Kingdom
Video games set on fictional planets
Virgin Interactive games
Windows games